Mount Cory is a mountain located in the Bow River Valley in southeast Banff National Park, just north of Banff, Alberta, Canada. The mountain was named in 1923 after William Wallace Cory, deputy minister of the Interior from 1905 to 1930.

The "Hole in the Wall"

The gaping "Hole in the Wall" cave is located in the upper portion of the western side of Mount Cory. The cave is a landmark easily viewed from the nearby Trans-Canada Highway. The formation is natural, despite the seemingly regular pentagonal shape of its entrance as seen from a distance. The cave is about 60 feet high and 100 feet deep and has often been visited by climbers.

Climate

Based on the Köppen climate classification, Mount Cory is located in a subarctic climate zone with cold, snowy winters, and mild summers. Winter temperatures can drop below -20 °C with wind chill factors below -30 °C.

See also
Geography of Alberta

Gallery

References

Caves of Alberta
Mountains of Banff National Park
Two-thousanders of Alberta